Plenna  is a village in the administrative district of Gmina Radoszyce, within Końskie County, Świętokrzyskie Voivodeship, in south-central Poland.

The village has a population of 260.

References

Plenna